is a Japanese actress and voice actress affiliated with Aoni Production. Her hobbies include painting, singing, and tennis.

She is most known for the roles of Mari-san, Alisa Mackintosh in Kinnikuman and Percy the Small Engine in the Japanese dub of Thomas the Tank Engine and Friends.

Notable voice work

Anime television
Asari-chan (1982) (Pupil)
Magical Angel Creamy Mami (1983) (Miya Nakahara)
Miyuki (1983) (Yuko Mizumori)
Urusei Yatsura (1984)
Adventures of the Little Koala (1984) (Lala)
Yume Senshi Wingman (1984) (Kiyomi)
Saint Seiya (1986) (Esmeralda)
Maple Town (1986) (Judy (First))
Sally, the Witch (1989) (Lou)
Mobile Suit Gundam SEED (2002) (Traffic Controllers/Woman Traffic Controllers)

Unknown date
Kiteretsu Daihyakka (Midori)
Kimagure Orange Road (Ushiko, Clerk)
Kinnikuman (Mari Nikaidō, Alisa Mackintosh, Kinnikuman (Kinniku Suguru) (young (ep.44)) Terryman (young (ep.75)), Gal, Children (A))
The Kabocha Wine (Mayumi, Cheergirl, Yoshie Ohta, Iyo)
Shin Bikkuriman (Minerunba)
Dancouga (Nurse)
Kimagure Orange Road (Ushiko)
Hello! Sandybell
City Hunter 2 (Maiko)
Hiwou War Chronicles (Children)
Tiger Mask Nisei (Mina Saiga)
Cheeky Angel (Yoriko)
Detective Conan (Housewife A, Woman, Nao Aikou, Hideko Kobayakawa)

Movies
Nine (1983) (Female Student)
Kinnikuman Series (1984–86) (Mari Nikaidō)

Video games
Neo Graduation (1994) (Maina Yasuda)
Graduation Vacation (1997) (Maina Yasuda)

Dubbing roles
Thomas the Tank Engine and Friends (Percy (Season 1–8), Clarabel (Season 1–8), Stephen Hatt (Season 6) and Bridget Hatt (Season 1)
Thomas and the Magic Railroad (Percy and Clarabel)
Dennis the Menace (Joey)
Rock-a-Doodle (Edmond)

References

External links
Official agency profile 

Living people
Voice actresses from Saitama Prefecture
Japanese child actresses
Japanese video game actresses
Japanese voice actresses
Year of birth missing (living people)
20th-century Japanese actresses
21st-century Japanese actresses
Aoni Production voice actors